François "Frans" De Haes (28 July 1899 – 4 November 1923) was a Belgian weightlifter who won a gold medal at the 1920 Summer Olympics in Antwerp. He set one world record in the clean and jerk in 1922.

To escape the German occupation, his family fled from Antwerp to the Netherlands, where he started weightlifting at age 17. After the war he returned to Antwerp. While preparing for the 1924 Summer Olympics, he caught influenza and died at age 28.

References

External links

1899 births
1923 deaths
Sportspeople from Antwerp
Belgian male weightlifters
Olympic weightlifters of Belgium
Weightlifters at the 1920 Summer Olympics
Olympic gold medalists for Belgium
Deaths from influenza
Olympic medalists in weightlifting
Medalists at the 1920 Summer Olympics
People associated with physical culture
20th-century Belgian people